Frank Tashlin (born Francis Fredrick von Taschlein, February 19, 1913 – May 5, 1972), also known as Tish Tash and Frank Tash, was an American animator, cartoonist, children's writer, illustrator, screenwriter, and film director. He was best known for his work on the Looney Tunes and Merrie Melodies series of animated shorts for Warner Bros., as well as his work as a director of live-action comedy films.

Animator and brief career as cartoonist
 
Born in Weehawken, New Jersey, Tashlin drifted from job to job after dropping out of high school in New Jersey at age 13. In 1930, he began working for John Foster as a cartoonist on the Aesop's Fables cartoon series, then worked briefly for Amadee J. Van Beuren, but he was just as much a drifter in his animation career as he had been as a teenager. Tashlin joined Leon Schlesinger's cartoon studio at Warner Bros. as an animator in 1933, where he was known as a fast animator. He used his free time to start his own comic strip in 1934 called Van Boring, inspired by former boss Van Beuren, which ran for three years. He signed his comic strip "Tish Tash," and used the same name for his cartoon credits (at the time it was considered extremely unprofessional to use anything except one's birth name among animators, but Tashlin was able to get away with this due to the anti-Germanic feelings of that era). Tashlin was fired from the studio when he refused to give Schlesinger a cut of his comic strip revenues. He joined the Ub Iwerks studio in 1934. He moved to Hal Roach's studio in 1935 as a writer.

He returned to Schlesinger in 1936 as an animation director, where his diverse interest and knowledge of the industry brought a new understanding of camerawork to the Warners directors. "He used all different kinds of camera angles, montages, and pan shots, vertical and horizontal." He directed 16 or 17 shorts from 1936 to 1938. He was making $150 a week. At one point he had an argument with studio manager Henry Binder and resigned. In 1938, he worked for Disney in the story department, where he made 50 dollars a week.

Afterward, he served as production manager at Columbia Pictures' Screen Gems animation studio in 1941. He effectively ran the studio and hired many former Disney staffers who had left as a result of the Disney animators' strike. He launched The Fox and the Crow series, one of the better products of the studio. He was fired over an argument with the executives of Columbia.

Tashlin rejoined the Warner directors of "Termite Terrace" in 1942. One of his directorial efforts was Porky Pig's Feat (1943). He stayed with the studio during World War II and worked on numerous wartime shorts, including the Private Snafu educational films. Shortly after he left Warner Bros. in late 1944, he directed some stop-motion puppet films for John Sutherland in 1946. Robert McKimson took over his unit after his departure from the studio.

His only Bugs Bunny shorts were The Unruly Hare and Hare Remover. The latter was also his last credit at Warner Bros.

Martha Sigall described him as "Here today, gone tomorrow. Now you see him, now you don't. That was Frank Tashlin, who would be working at Leon Schlesinger's one day, and, suddenly, gone the next day."

Film director and writer
Tashlin moved on from animation in 1946 to become a gag writer for the Marx Brothers, Lucille Ball, and others, and as a screenwriter for stars such as Bob Hope and Red Skelton. His live-action films still echo elements of his animation background; Tashlin peppered them with unlikely sight gags, breakneck pacing, and unexpected plot twists.

Tashlin began his career directing feature films when he was asked to finish directing the 1951 film The Lemon Drop Kid starring Bob Hope.

Beginning with the 1956 film The Girl Can't Help It, with its satirical look at early rock and roll, Tashlin had a streak of commercial successes with the Martin and Lewis film Hollywood or Bust in 1956, Will Success Spoil Rock Hunter? in 1957, which, like 1956's The Girl Can't Help It, starred actress and Playboy model Jayne Mansfield, and six of Jerry Lewis' early solo films (Rock-A-Bye Baby, The Geisha Boy, Cinderfella, It's Only Money, Who's Minding the Store?, and The Disorderly Orderly).

Moreover, in the 1950s Tashlin came to the approving attention of French film magazine Cahiers du Cinéma, in reviews that the director dismissed as "all this philosophical double-talk." Also, the broad, colorful satire of Madison Avenue advertising in Will Success Spoil Rock Hunter? earned the film a place on the National Film Registry in 2000. In 2014, his stop-motion animation short The Way of Peace was also added to the Registry.

In the 1960s, Tashlin's films lost some of their spark, and his career ended in the latter part of that decade, along with those of most of the stars with whom he had worked. His final film was The Private Navy of Sgt. O'Farrell starring Bob Hope and Phyllis Diller in 1968.

Author
Tashlin wrote and illustrated three books, The Bear That Wasn't (1946), The Possum That Didn't (1950), and The World That Isn't (1951). These are often referred to as "children's books" although all contained satirical elements; The Bear That Wasn't was adapted as an animated cartoon by Tashlin's former Warner Bros. colleague, Chuck Jones, in 1967. Another children's story which Tashlin wrote in 1949 was recorded by Spike Jones: How the Circus Learned to Smile. Tashlin also wrote and self-published an instructional booklet entitled How to Create Cartoons (about cartoon drawing, not animation) in 1952.

Death
Tashlin died at Cedars-Sinai Medical Center in Los Angeles after being stricken with a coronary thrombosis three days before at his Beverly Hills home. He is buried at Forest Lawn Memorial Park in Glendale, California.

Filmography

Cartoon shorts

Feature films

Sources

References

External links

 Frank Tashlin Senses of Cinema: Great Directors Critical Database
 "Private SNAFU – The Home Front", 1943 cartoon directed by Tashlin, viewable online
 New York Times article
 Literature on Frank Tashlin
 How to Create Cartoons
 Frank Tashlin Lambiek Comiclopedia 

1913 births
1972 deaths
American animators
American children's writers
American children's book illustrators
American comics artists
American male screenwriters
Screenwriters from New Jersey
Burials at Forest Lawn Memorial Park (Glendale)
Film directors from New Jersey
People from Weehawken, New Jersey
20th-century American screenwriters
Articles containing video clips
Walt Disney Animation Studios people
Warner Bros. Cartoons directors
Deaths from coronary thrombosis
20th-century American male writers